Carlos Drummond de Andrade (October 31, 1902 – August 17, 1987) was a Brazilian poet and writer, considered by some as the greatest Brazilian poet of all time.

He has become something of a national cultural symbol in Brazil, where his widely influential poem "Canção Amiga" ("Friendly Song") has been featured on the 50-cruzado novo bill.

Biography
Drummond was born in Itabira, a mining village in Minas Gerais in the southeastern region of Brazil. His parents were farmers belonging to old Brazilian families of mainly Portuguese origin. He went to a school of pharmacy in Belo Horizonte, but never worked as a pharmacist after graduation, as he did not enjoy the career he chose. He worked as a civil servant for most of his life, eventually becoming director of the history for the National Historical and Artistic Heritage Service of Brazil.  
Though his earliest poems are formal and satirical, Drummond quickly adopted the new forms of Brazilian modernism that were evolving in the 1920s, incited by the work of Mário de Andrade (to whom he was not related). He would mingle speech fluent in elegance and derive truth about his surroundings, many times describing quotidian, normal aspects of life while achieving a fluidity of thought and speech. Drummond drifted towards communism at the start of World War II and took up the editorship of the Brazilian Communist Party's official newspaper, Tribuna Popular, but later abandoned the post due to disagreements over censorship, which Drummond staunchly opposed.

Drummond's work is generally divided into several segments, which appear very markedly in each of his books. But this is somewhat misleading, since even in the midst of his everyday poems or his socialist, politicized poems, there appear creations which can be easily incorporated into his later metaphysical canon, and none of these styles is completely free of the others. There is surely much metaphysical content in even his most political poems.

The most prominent of these later metaphysical poems is A Máquina do Mundo (The World's Machine). The poem deals with an anti-Faust referred to in the first person, who receives the visit of the aforementioned Machine, which stands for all possible knowledge, and the sum of the answers for all the questions which afflict men; in highly dramatic and baroque versification, the poem develops only for the anonymous subject to decline the offer of endless knowledge and proceed his gloomy path in the solitary road. It takes the renaissance allegory of the Machine of the World from Portugal's most esteemed poet, Luís de Camões, more precisely, from a canto at the end of his epic masterpiece Os Lusíadas.

One of those said segments have been found only after his death: deliberately erotic poetry. That type of poetry has been published in only one book, "Moça deitada na grama" (woman laid down in the grass) with the authorization and actual intervention by his son-in-law.
  
Drummond is a favorite of American poets, a number of whom, including Mark Strand and Lloyd Schwartz, have translated his work. Later writers and critics have sometimes credited his relationship with Elizabeth Bishop, his first English language translator, as influential for his American reception, but though she admired him, Bishop claimed she barely even knew him. In an interview with George Starbuck in 1977, she said, "I didn't know him at all. He's supposed to be very shy. I'm supposed to be very shy. We've met once — on the sidewalk at night. We had just come out of the same restaurant, and he kissed my hand politely when we were introduced."

Style

Drummond, as a writer of the modernist style, follows the writing mechanic proposed by Mário de Andrade and Oswald de Andrade; making use of free verse, and not depending on a fixed meter. In modernism, the predominant style which Drummond wrote in, styles were divided into lyrical and subjective or objective and concrete, Drummond would be part of the latter, similar to Oswald de Andrade. 

Drummond was the first poet to assert himself after the premiere modernist of Brazil and created a unique style dominated by his writing. His work displays linguistic freedom and free verse. But it goes beyond that: "The work of Drummond reaches – as Fernando Pessoa, Jorge de Lima, Murilo Mendes, and Herberto Helder – a coefficient of loneliness that detached from the soil of history, leading the reader to an attitude-free of references, trademarks or ideological or prospective," said Alfredo Bosi (1994). 

His poetry, according to Affonso Romano de Sant'Anna, can be divided into three parts:

 I, greater than the world – marked by ironic poetry
 I, lower than the world – marked by social poetry
 I, equal to the world – covers the metaphysical poetry

In the late 1980s, his poetry began to become more erotic. O Amor Natural (Natural Love), a collection of erotic poems, was published posthumously. The book inspired the 1996 Dutch documentary film O Amor Natural.

Tribute
On 31 October 2019, Google celebrated his 117th birthday with a Google Doodle.

Bibliography

Poetry
(1930)'Alguma Poesia' (Some Poetry) 
(1934)'Brejo das Almas'
(1940)'Sentimento do Mundo' (The feeling of the world)
(1942)José
(1945)'A Rosa do Povo' (The People's Rose)
(1951)'Claro Enigma' (Clear Enigma)
(1954)'Fazendeiro do Ar' 
(1954)'Quadrilha' 
(1955)'Viola de Bolso' 
(1964)'Lição de Coisas' (Lesson of Things) 
(1968)'Boitempo' 
(1968)'A Falta Que Ama' 
(1968)'Nudez' (Nudity)
(1973)'As Impurezas do Branco' (The Impurity of the White)
(1973)'Menino Antigo' (Boitempo II) 
(1977)'A Visita' (The Visit) 
(1977)'Discurso do Primavera e Alguma Sombra'
(1978)'O Marginal Clorildo Gato'
(1979)'Esquecer para Lembrar' (Boitempo III)
(1980)'A Paixão de Medida' 
(1983)'Caso do Vestido' 

Corpo (1984)
Amar se aprende amando (1985)
Poesia Errante (1988)
O Amor Natural (1992)
Farewell (1996)
Os ombros suportam o mundo(1935)
Futebol a arte (1970)
Antologia poética:
A última pedra no meu caminho (1950)
50 poemas escolhidos pelo autor (1956)
Antologia Poética (1962)
Antologia Poética (1965)
Seleta em Prosa e Verso (1971)
Amor, Amores (1975)
Carmina drummondiana (1982)
Boitempo I e Boitempo II (1987)
Minha morte (1987)
O Elefante (1983)
História de dois amores (1985)
O pintinho (1988)
Carol e Dinha(2009)

Prose
Confissões de Minas (1944)
Contos de Aprendiz (1951)
Passeios na Ilha (1952)
Fala, amendoeira (1957)
A bolsa & a vida (1962)
Cadeira de balanço (1966)
Caminhos de João Brandão (1970)
O poder ultrajovem e mais 79 textos em prosa e verso (1972)
De notícias & não-notícias faz-se a crônica (1974)
Os dias lindos (1977)
70 historinhas (1978)
Contos plausíveis (1981)
Boca de luar (1984)
O observador no escritório (1985)
Tempo vida poesia (1986)
Moça deitada na grama (1987)
O avesso das coisas (1988)
Auto-retrato e outras crônicas (1989)
As histórias das muralhas (1989)

English translations
Souvenir of the Ancient World, translated by Mark Strand (Antaeus Editions, 1976)
Looking for Poetry: Poems by Carlos Drummond de Andrade and Rafael Alberti, with Songs from the Quechua, translated by Mark Strand (Knopf, 2002)
Traveling in the Family : Selected Poems of Carlos Drummond de Andrade, edited by Thomas Colchie and Mark Strand (Random House, 1986)
The Minus Sign: Selected Poems, translated by Virginia de Araujo (Black Swan, 1980)
In the Middle of the Road; Selected Poems, translated by John A Nist (U of Arizona, 1965)
Multitudinous Heart: Selected Poems: A Bilingual Edition, translated by Richard Zenith (Farrar, Straus and Giroux, 2015)

Reviews
 Pontiero, Giovanni, (1982), review of The Minus Sign, in Cencrastus No. 9, Summer 1982, p. 47,

Further reading

English
Brazilian writers (encyclopedia) / Mônica Rector, ed. 2005
 Seven Faces:  Brazilian Poetry since Modernism / Charles A. Perrone, 1996
The Cambridge history of Latin American literature. Volume 3, Brazilian literature / Roberto González Echevarría., 1996
Tropical paths: essays on modern Brazilian literature / Randal Johnson., 1993
Brazilian literature: a research bibliography / David William Foster., 1990
The unquiet self: self and society in the poetry of Carlos Drummond de Andrade / Ricardo Sternberg., 1986
Carlos Drummond de Andrade and his generation : proceedings  / Frederick G Williams., 1986
The poetry and poetics of Carlos Drummond de Andrade; diss. / John Gledson., 1979
The theme of human communication in the poetry of Carlos Drummond de Andrade, article / Mary Patricia O'Brien, 1970

Portuguese
Drummond cordial / Jerônimo Teixeira., 2005
A rima na poesia de Carlos Drummond de Andrade & outros ensaios / Hélcio de Andrade Martins., 2005
Drummond, a magia lúcida / Marlene de Castro Correia., 2002
Leituras de Drummond / Flávio Loureiro Chaves, 2002
Drummond: um olhar amoroso / Luzia de Maria, 2002
A prosa à luz da poesia em Carlos Drummond de Andrade / Regina Souza Vieira, 2002
Carlos Drummond de Andrade: a poética do cotidiano / Maria Veronica Aguilera, 2002
Drummond, poesia e experiência / Ivete Lara Camargos Walty, 2002
Drummond revisitado / Chantal Castelli, 2002
Coração partido:  uma análise da poesia reflexiva de Drummond / Davi Arrigucci Júnior, 2002
Drummond: da rosa do povo à rosa das trevas / Vagner Camilo, 2001
Carlos Drummond de Andrade / Francisco Achcar, 2000
Ideologia e forma literária em Carlos Drummond de Andrade / Lucila Nogueira, 1990

Spanish
Una poética de la despreocupación: modernidad e identidad en cuatro poetas latinoamericanos / Rafael Rodríguez, 2003
Drummond, el poeta en el tiempo / Affonso Romano de Sant'Anna, 2003
Las retoricas de la decadencia: Martí, Palés, Drummond / Maribel Roig, 2001
Estado de alerta y estado de inocencia : algunas reflexiones sobre la poesía y el arte / E Bayley, 1996
Manuel Bandeira, Cecilia Meireles, Carlos Drummond de Andrade / Cipriano S Vitureira, 1952

External links

 
The DVD of the film O Amor Natural by Heddy Honigmann, on the erotic poetry of Carlos Drummond de Andrade
[Music] O Amor Natural, the erotic poetry of Carlos Drummond de Andrade translated into music by Georgia Dias & Boca
The Elephant, translated by Mark Strand.  From Ploughshares, 1975.
In the Middle of the Road, translated by Elizabeth Bishop.
 Biography of Carlos Drummond de Andrade .
Carmos Drummond de Andrade recorded at the Library of Congress for the Hispanic Division's audio literary archive on July 29, 1974

References

1902 births
1987 deaths
People from Minas Gerais
Brazilian people of Portuguese descent
Brazilian people of Scottish descent
Brazilian communists
Communist poets
Brazilian male poets
Brazilian agnostics
Modernist poets
Portuguese-language writers
20th-century Brazilian poets
Carlos
20th-century Brazilian male writers
Culture in Minas Gerais